Slavic Voice of America ( Golos Slavyan Ameriki) is a Newspaper, Radio Program and Web Portal serving 10 million Russian, Ukrainian, Belarusian-speaking American and Canadian immigrants and their families from countries of the former Soviet Union, including some non-Slavic countries like Estonia, Latvia and Lithuania. Published by "Genesis Press, Inc" registered in Dallas, Texas, where the company also has its headquarters.

In September 2012 Slavic Voice of America printed edition succeeded by The Dallas Telegraph printed newspaper. In September 2013 The Texas Telegraph launched.

Leadership 
 Serge Taran; Publisher and Chief Executive Officer
 Ludmila Taran; Vice President, Managing Editor

Languages 
Russian, Ukrainian, English.

References

External links 
Slavic Voice of America

Russian-American culture
Ukrainian-American culture
Belarusian-American culture
Russian-Canadian culture
Ukrainian-Canadian culture
Mass media in Dallas